Stockholm Environment Institute, or SEI, is a non-profit, independent research and policy institute specialising in sustainable development and environmental issues, with seven affiliate offices around the world. SEI works on climate change, energy systems, water resources, air quality, land-use, sanitation, food security, and trade issues with the aim to shift policy and practice towards sustainability.

SEI wants to support decision-making and induce change towards sustainable development around the world by providing knowledge that bridges science and policy in the field of environment and development.

History 
SEI was established in 1989 as an initiative of the Government of Sweden.

Activities

Programs 
 Ecological Sanitation Research Programme
 LEAP: Low Emissions Analysis Platform
 Regional Air Pollution In Developing Countries (RAPDIC)
 Resources and Energy Analysis Programme (REAP)
 SIANI Swedish International Agriculture Network Initiative (siani.se)
 Sustainable Mekong Research Network Programme (SUMERNET)
 TRASE Transparent supply chains for sustainable economies
 weADAPT
 WEAP: Water Evaluation And Planning System

Partnerships 
 SEI was one of the organizations who founded the Sustainable Sanitation Alliance in 2007 together with the German Development Organization (GIZ)

Organizational structure

Executive Directors
1989–1990 Gordon T. Goodman
1991–1995 Michael J. Chadwick
1996–1999 Nicholas C. Sonntag
2000 Bert Bolin (interim Executive Director)
2000 Lars Nilsson (interim Executive Director)
2000–2004 Roger Kasperson
2004–2012 Johan Rockström
2012–2018 Johan L. Kuylenstierna
2018–present Måns Nilsson (Executive Director)

Centres
SEI operates in seven countries: Sweden, United States, United Kingdom, Estonia, Thailand, Kenya, and Colombia.

Funding sources 
The Swedish International Development Cooperation Agency (Sida) is SEI's main donor. SEI also receives funding from development agencies, governments, NGOs, universities, businesses, and financial institutions.

For example, the Bill and Melinda Gates Foundation also provides funds to SEI in the area of maternal health and in sustainable sanitation. At the SEI Science Forum in 2015, Melinda Gates took part to discuss sustainability and gender together with SEI staff to help shape SEI's future research.

References

External links
 Official website

Environmental research institutes
Environmentalism in Sweden
International research institutes
Research institutes in Sweden
Sustainability organizations
Organizations established in 1989
1989 establishments in Sweden
Organizations based in Stockholm